Spook & Destroy is the third extended play by American horror punk musician Wednesday 13. It was released on 9 October 2012. This EP includes 2 new songs, 3 re-recordings of existing songs from Wednesday 13 and another projects, an acoustic version of "Curse of Me" and 2 remixes.

Track listing

Personnel
Wednesday 13 - lead vocals, keyboards
Roman Surman - lead guitar, background vocals
Jack Tankersley - guitar, background vocals
Troy Doebbler - bass, background vocals
Jason "Shakes" West - drums

References

2012 EPs
Wednesday 13 albums